The Dornier Viper was a West German/Norwegian air-to-air missile project, intended to replace the AIM-9 Sidewinder, in Luftwaffe service from 1975/76.

The Viper was developed by Bodenseewerk and Dornier Systems, using an infrared seeker and a new solid-fuel rocket motor (by Kongsberg Vapenfabrik), intended to have twice the burn time of the Sidewinder.

In 1974, the Viper was abandoned in favor of evaluating an American missile.

Length: 
Diameter: 
Weight:

References

Notes

Bibliography
 .
 .

Air-to-air missiles of Germany
Abandoned military projects of Germany
Air-to-air missiles of the Cold War